is a former professional tennis player from Japan.

Biography

Early life
Inoue was born in Tokyo on 7 June 1977. A right-handed baseline player, she started tennis aged nine and was coached by her father Gou. Her younger sisters, Maiko and Akari, also played on the professional tennis circuit.

She had her best year as a junior in 1995 when she was a girls' singles quarter-finalist at the Australian Open and semi-finalist at the Wimbledon Championships.

Professional career
In 1996 she graduated from high school and began competing on the professional tour.

Her earliest success on the WTA Tour came at the Wismilak International in Surabaya, where he made the quarter-finals in both 1996 and 1997.

She qualified for her first Grand Slam tournament at the 1997 Wimbledon Championships and was beaten by seventh seed Anke Huber in the first round.

In the 1998 season she reached her highest ranking of 108 in the world. Her highlights in 1998 include reaching the quarter-finals of the ENKA Open in Istanbul as well as main draw appearances in three of the four Grand Slam tournaments. At Wimbledon she was one of only three players to take a set off Nathalie Tauziat on the Frenchwoman's run to the final.

She never represented Japan at Fed Cup level but was a member of the bronze medal winning women's team at the 1998 Asian Games.

ITF finals

Singles (2–4)

Doubles (1-4)

References

External links
 
 

1977 births
Living people
Japanese female tennis players
Asian Games bronze medalists for Japan
Asian Games medalists in tennis
Sportspeople from Tokyo
Tennis players at the 1998 Asian Games
Medalists at the 1998 Asian Games
20th-century Japanese women
21st-century Japanese women